Eustace I, Count of Boulogne, was a nobleman and founder of the Boulogne branch of the House of Flanders. He held the county of Boulogne from 1024 until his death in 1047.

Life
Eustace was the elder son of Count Baldwin II of Boulogne and Adelina of Holland. He succeeded his father as count of Boulogne in 1024. Eustace was also the count of Lens. In 1028 Eustace confirmed the foundation of a college of canons in his castle at Lens and despite accounts of Lens passing to Baldwin V of Flanders circa 1036 it was still held by Eustace and was passed to his son Lambert at his death.

During the minority of Baldwin IV, Count of Flanders, Eustace's grandfather, Arnulf III, Count of Boulogne had broken free of Flanders and operated as an independent prince, as did Eustace's father and Eustace himself. In 995, having attained his majority, Baldwin IV attempted to recover several of the independently held castles and to expand the Flemish borders. This had caused considerable animosity between Baldwin IV, Count of Flanders and Eustace's father, but when Baldwin IV's son Baldwin V succeeded him in 1035 Eustace and Baldwin V of Flanders cooperated on several ventures including several charters and in limiting the powers of the Castellan-advocates of several abbeys including the Abbey of Saint Bertin in Flanders.

Eustace was allied to the ducal house of Normandy by the marriage of his son Eustace II to Goda, niece of Richard II. This had far reaching alliances to other branches of these families including that of Edward the Confessor, King of England. Under Eustace the counts of Boulogne rose to great prominence in Northern France. Eustace I died in 1047.

Eustace was apparently a patron of Samer Abbey near Calais and he is said to have been buried there.

Family and children

Eustace married Matilda of Louvain, daughter of Lambert I of Louvain and Gerberga of Lower Lorraine and had:

Eustace II of Boulogne.
Godfrey, Bishop of Paris (1061–1095)
Lambert II, Count of Lens.
Gerberga, married Frederick, Duke of Lower Lorraine

Notes

References

Sources

1049 deaths
11th-century French people
House of Boulogne
Counts of Boulogne
Year of birth unknown
House of Flanders